Candalides erinus, the small dusky-blue, is a species of butterfly of the family Lycaenidae. It is found in Australia and Indonesia.

The wingspan is about 20 mm. Adults are dark brown with a purple sheen. The underside is fawn with brown markings.

The larvae have been recorded feeding on Cassytha aurea, Cassytha filiformis and Cassytha pubescens. They are velvety green with a pale yellow dorsal line edged with brown markings. Pupation takes place in a grey or brown pupa with a length of about 10 mm.

Subspecies
C. e. erinus (Darwin, Cape York to northern New South Wales)
C. e. tualensis (Röber, 1886) (Kai Island)
C. e. stevensi Wind & Clench, 1947 (West Irian to southern New Guinea)
C. e. sumbensis (Tite, 1963) (Lesser Sunda Islands)
C. e. timorensis (Tite, 1963) (Timor, Wetar, Kissar, Letti islands)
C. e. taamensis (Tite, 1963) (Kur and Taam)
C. e. tenimberensis (Tite, 1963) (Tanimbar islands)
C. e. sudesta (Tite, 1963) (Tagula Island)

References

Candalidini
Butterflies described in 1775
Taxa named by Johan Christian Fabricius